Posen-Robbins School District 143½ is a school district based in Posen, Illinois near Chicago, United States. The district, which serves all or portions of Posen, Robbins, Blue Island, Harvey, and Markham, is about 20 minutes of transportation away from the Chicago Loop. The district serves grades Pre-K through 8th grade and has over 1,500 students and 87 teachers.

Demographics
In a 10-year period ending in 2014 the district changed from being 58% black to 58% Hispanic. The changes lead to a decrease in academic achievement. In a three-year period ending in 2013, one elementary school saw its rank drop by 130 places. As a result, the district began attempts to recruit teachers from Spain. The superintendent received training on how to read announcements in the Spanish language at school assemblies.

Schools
 Thomas J. Kellar Middle School (6-8) – Robbins
 Posen Intermediate School (4-5) – Posen
 Bernice Childs Elementary School  (Kindergarten – 3) – Robbins
 John Gordon Elementary School – (Kindergarten – 3) – Posen
 Delia M. Turner Elementary School (Pre-K – Kindergarten) – Crestwood

References

External links

 

School districts in Cook County, Illinois